Third Rock from the Sun is the fourth studio album by American country music artist Joe Diffie. Diffie's breakthrough album, the first five tracks were all released as singles, and all charted on the Billboard Hot Country Singles & Tracks (now Hot Country Songs) charts. Of these five singles, "Pickup Man" and the title track were both Number One hits, "So Help Me Girl" reached #2, "I'm in Love with a Capital 'U'" reached #21, and "That Road Not Taken" peaked at #40. "Pickup Man" was also Diffie's longest-lasting number one, having held that position for four weeks.

Track listing

Personnel
Lee Bogan - background vocals (1, 11)
Walt Cunningham - electric keyboards (1, 3, 5, 6, 9), synthesizer strings (3, 5, 9), special effects (6)
Billy Dean – background vocals (10)
John Dickson - cow sounds (11)
Joe Diffie - lead vocals (all tracks), background vocals (all tracks), cow sounds (11)
Stuart Duncan - fiddle (4, 6, 7, 9, 10)
Craig "Flash" Fletcher - background vocals (1, 11)
Paul Franklin - steel guitar (1-7, 9)
Clay Keith - background vocals (5, 6)
Larry Keith - background vocals (5, 6)
Terry McMillan - harmonica (8, 10)
Brent Mason - electric guitar (all tracks)
Tim Mensy - acoustic guitar (5, 8)
Larry Paxton - bass guitar (3-6, 8-11)
Matt Rollings - piano (all tracks)
Johnny Slate - cow sounds (11)
Billy Joe Walker Jr. - acoustic guitar (all tracks)
Lonnie Wilson - drums (all tracks), percussion (1, 2, 8, 10, 11)
Glenn Worf - bass guitar (1, 2, 7)

Track information and credits adapted from Discogs and AllMusic, then verified from the album's liner notes.

Charts

Weekly charts

Year-end charts

Singles

Certifications

Notes

1994 albums
Joe Diffie albums
Epic Records albums